York, Ontario refers to multiple places in Ontario:

 York, Ontario is a former municipality within the current city of Toronto, Ontario, Canada.
 York County, Ontario, a former county in Ontario, dissolved in 1971
 Regional Municipality of York, also called York Region, which replaced it

 York, Upper Canada, a town which was incorporated as Toronto in 1834
 York, a compact rural unincorporated community within Haldimand County, Ontario